Vlada Alexandrovna Chigireva (born 18 December 1994) is a Russian competitor in synchronised swimming.

Chigireva won six gold medals at World Aquatics Championships: three in 2013 and three in 2015. She was also the solo and team champion in both the 2010 and the 2012 FINA World Junior Synchronised Swimming Championships. She also won a gold medal at the 2014 European Aquatics Championships, as well as two gold medals at the 2013 Summer Universiade. She missed the 2018 European Championships due to a knee injury in 2017 that required surgery. 

Chigireva spent much time in a pool since early age, as her mother is a swimming coach, and took up swimming aged five. She has a degree in sports psychology from the Russian State University of Physical Education, Sport, Youth and Tourism.

References

External links

Profile at the 2013 Summer Universiade

Living people
Russian synchronized swimmers
1994 births
World Aquatics Championships medalists in synchronised swimming
Sportspeople from Rostov-on-Don
Synchronized swimmers at the 2015 World Aquatics Championships
Synchronized swimmers at the 2013 World Aquatics Championships
Synchronized swimmers at the 2016 Summer Olympics
Synchronized swimmers at the 2020 Summer Olympics
Olympic synchronized swimmers of Russia
Olympic gold medalists for Russia
Olympic gold medalists for the Russian Olympic Committee athletes
Olympic medalists in synchronized swimming
Medalists at the 2016 Summer Olympics
Medalists at the 2020 Summer Olympics
Synchronized swimmers at the 2017 World Aquatics Championships
Universiade medalists in synchronized swimming
Universiade gold medalists for Russia
Artistic swimmers at the 2019 World Aquatics Championships
European Aquatics Championships medalists in synchronised swimming
Medalists at the 2013 Summer Universiade